Heo Mok (Hangul: 허목, Hanja: 許穆; 10 January 1596 – 2 June 1682) was a Korean calligrapher, painter, philosopher, poet, and politician during the Joseon Dynasty, who came from the Yangcheon Heo clan. He was most commonly known by the pen name Misu(미수,眉叟,translated as the "eyebrowed old man").

Heo was known as the best Korean calligrapher of his time due to his unique style of calligraphy. He became a governor at the age of 81, and was the first person in Korean history to hold such a high-ranking position without taking the Gwageo civil service exam.

Life

Early life 
Heo Mok was born at Changseonbang (창선방,彰善坊), in Hanseong. His father, Heo Kyo, was a member of the lower bureaucracy, while his great-grandfather, Heo Ja, once served as the Vice Prime Minister of Joseon.

Heo Mok's maternal grandfather, Im Je, was a student of Seo Gyeong-deok. His father, Heo Kyo, was a student of Park Ji-hwa. Seo Gyeong-deok and Park Ji-hwa's more academic and ideologically-successful pupils were to join the political faction called Easterners (or Dongin; 동인, 東人) at the Joseon Court. However, a schism divided court politics into two newly-formed factions: Southerners (or Namin; 남인, 南人) and Northerners (or Bukin; 북인, 北人), with the Easterners being assimilated into the Northerners. Heo's family were thus members of the Northerners faction.

Heo Mok's early years were spent as a disciple to Yi San-hae and at Yi Won-ik's distinct private scholarly institutions.

In 1613, he married Lady Yi of the Jeonju Yi clan, a granddaughter of Yi Won-ik (art name Ohri). The marriage was initially met with opposition from his wife's family, but Yi Won-ik's support made it successful.

Early career 
In 1615, Heo Mok and his cousin, Heo Hu, went to study at Jeong Gu's private educational institute, where they remained until 1620.

In 1626, Heo Mok, as the head of management of the dormitory of educational institutions, imposed personal sanctions on scholar Park Ji-gye accusing him of joining King Injo's attempt to destroy the Li. As a result, he was banned from applying for Gwageo for a period of time.

Political movements 
In 1651, he was commended for his philosophical learning skills, and appointed to the position of Naesikyokwan (내시교관, 內侍敎官), but a few years later, he resigned.

In 1656, after serving as Jojiseobyuljwa, and as Gongjojwarang (공조좌랑, 工曺佐郞), he was appointed Yonggunghyungam (용궁현감, 龍宮縣監), but resigned shortly after.

In 1657, he was reappointed to Gongjojwarang, then appointed to Saheonbu Jupyung (사헌부장령, 司憲府掌令), and then to Saboksi Jubu (사복시주부, 司僕侍主簿).

In 1658, he was reappointed to Saheonbu Jupyung.

In 1659, King Hyojong appointed Heo Mok to Buhogun (부호군, 副護軍), and later that September, he became head of Jangakwon (장악원정, 掌樂院正). In December, he was appointed as leader of Sanguiwon (상의원정, 尙衣院正).

During King Hyojong's funeral, he was in conflict with Song Si-yeol and Song Jun-kil regarding the appropriate length of time for which Queen Jangryeol (자의대비; at the time called "Grand Royal Queen Dowager Jaui"), the second wife of King Injo, should mourn her step-son, based on Confucian rules.

Yesong arguments

First Yesong argument 
In May of 1659(by the lunar calendar used at the time), an ideological dispute over how long the Queen Jangnyeol(also known as Grand Royal Queen Dowager Jaui) should wear her mourning clothes for the death of her stepson Hyojong of Joseon known as the "Kihae Yesong(己亥禮訟,Yesong(The arguemnt on morals) on the year of Kihae) also known as the First of Yesong Ronjaeng (제1차 예송 논쟁, 第一次禮訟論爭,First Dispute over rituals).The dispute was sparked by a contradiction of ritual principles that can be applied because of the dubious nature of the position of Hyojong of Joseon,because despite him being born as the second son of Injo of Joseon, he can be considered the eldest son because of the rule that says "anyone who is the legitimate heir to the throne is treated as the eldest son".Regarding this matter two opposing political factions, the Southerners faction and the Westerners faction disagreed.

Song Si-yeol and Song Jun-kil, two leaders of the Westerners faction (or Seoin; 서인, 西人), argued that the Queen should mourn for Hyojong for just a year, since he was only Injo's second son (despite being the legitimate heir to the throne), and thus was not fit to be mourned for three years, which was the normal period of mourning for eldest sons. On the other hand, Heo Mok and Yun Hyu(who was part of the Southerners faction) argued that Hyojong, as King Injo's successor, should be practically treated as if he was Injo's eldest son, and based on this interpretation, Queen Jaui should mourn for three years for her husband's son. While Song Si-yeol asserted the status of Joseon Dynasty as "small China" to justify his arguments based on Chinese Neo-Confucian rule books, Heo Mok asserted the status of the Kingdom of Joseon as a "different country that is beyond the rule of China" (방외별국, 方外別國), thus different rules should be applied.
As a result of the dispute, Yeonguijeong Jung Tae-hwa decided to set the  mourning period for Grand Royal Queen Dowager Jaui to one year, based on the rules of Gyeongguk daejeon and was the state official solution(which did not differentiate the biological elders and biological second sons), but was considered a political win for Westerners faction.

Second Yesong argument 
During that period, he wrote Kieun (기언, 記言) and Dongsa (or "Eastern History"; 동사, 東史). The "Eastern History" was a Korean history book that considered the national ancestor as Dangun, which was against the general idea of the national ancestor being Gija.

In 1674, King Hyojong's wife, Queen Inseon, died. This revived the dispute over the length of the period Queen Jangnyeol,who was the mother in law of Queen Inseon, should wear mourning clothes for the death of Queen Inseon, and the dispute was known as the "Kapinyesong(甲寅禮訟, dispute of morals on the year of Kapin)" or the "second Yesong arguement". Song Si-yeol argued that Queen Inseon, as the wife of Injo's second son, should be mourned for 9 months. But Heo Mok and Yun Hyu maintained that Hyojong was the successor of King Injo, which practically made Queen Inseon the first daughter-in-law and required one year of mourning.

King Hyeonjong was unpleasant by "King Hyojong's Second" title and wanted a cabinet reshuffle, in order to give the power to the Southerners (at that time, the westerners was the ruling party, headed by Song Si-yeol). This meant a victory for Heo Mok and Yun Hyu, but  Hyeonjong died soon after.

Acquisition of power 
Despite Hyeonjong's death, Heo Mok was still trusted. In November 1674, he was appointed to Yijochamui (이조참의, 吏曺參議) and continuously served as Saheonbu Daesaheon (사헌부대사헌, 司憲府大司憲). In 1675 he was successively appointed for posts such as Yijochampan (이조참판, 吏曺參判), Bibyungukdangsang (비변국당상, 備邊局堂上), Jwachamchan (좌참찬, 左參讚), Yijopanseo (이조판서, 吏曺判書) and Wuchamchan (우참찬, 右參讚). In 1676, Heo Mok was promoted to Right State Councillor of Joseon.

In 1679, Heo Gyeon, a party member and Chief State Councillor Heo Juk's illegitimate son, abused his power and Heo Mok attacked Heo Juk for it, but King Sukjong and the Southerners took Heo Gyeon's side.

Death 
On June 2, 1682, he died in Gyeonggi Province, at the age of 86.

The Westerners continued to attack Heo Mok and Yun Hyu, calling them Samunanjeok (사문난적, 斯文亂賊).

In 1689, he was rehabilitated. In 1692, he was posthumously conferred the honours of a Chief State Councillor. Heo Mok was also awarded the posthumous title Munjeong (문정, 文正).

Books 
 Gyeongnye Yuchan (경례유찬, 經禮類纂) (1647)
 Dongsa [Eastern History] (동사, 東史) (1667)
 Cheongsa Yeoljeon [Blue Gentlemen List] (청사열전 淸士列傳) (1667)
 Gyeongseol (경설 經說) (1677)
 Misu Cheonjamun (미수 천자문 眉叟天字文)
 Dangun Sega [Dangun's Family] (단군세가 檀君世家)
 Misu Kieun (미수기언, 眉叟記言)
 Sim Hakdo (심학도, 心學圖)
 Bangguk Wangjorye (방국왕조례, 邦國王朝禮)
 Jeongche Jeonjungseol (정체전중설, 正體傳重說)
 Yosun Ujeon Susimbeopdo (요순우전수심법도, 堯舜禹傳授心法圖)
 Heo Mok Sugobon (허목수고본, 許穆手稿本)
 Duta Sangi (두타산기, 頭陀山記)

Gallery

Family
Great-Great-Grandfather
 Heo Won (허원)
Great-Grandfather
 Heo Ja (허자, 許磁; 1496 – 1551)
 Great-Grandmother
 Lady Yi of the Jeonju Yi clan (전주 이씨); Heo Ja’s second wife
 Step-Great-Grandmother: Lady Kim of the Gwangsan Kim clan (광산 김씨); Heo Ja’s first wife
 Grandfather
 Heo Gang (허강, 許橿)
 Grandmother
 Lady Kang of the Jinju Kang clan (진주 강씨)
 Father: Heo Gyo (허교, 許喬; 1567 – 1632)
 Uncle: Heo Yang (허양, 許亮)
 Cousin: Heo Hu (허후, 許厚)
 Mother: Lady Im of the Naju Im clan (나주 임씨; 1575 – 1647)
 Grandfather: Im Je (임제, 林悌)
 Siblings
 Younger brother: Heo Ui (허의, 許懿)
 Nephew: Heo Heub (허흡)
 Younger brother: Heo Seo (허서, 許舒)
 Nephew: Heo Gong (허공)
 Nephew: Heo Chung (허충)
 Nephew: Heo Ho (허호)
 Nephew: Heo Suk (허숙)
 Wife and issue
 Lady Yi of the Jeonju Yi clan (전주 이씨; 1597 – 1653)
 Son: Heo Hwon (허훤, 許翧; 1615 – ?)
 Daughter-in-law: Lady Choe of the Jeonju Choe clan (전주 최씨)
 Grandson: Heo Sang (허상, 許恦)
 Great-grandson: Heo Bu (허부, 許溥)
 Grandson: Heo Don (허돈)
 Grandson: Heo Won (허원)
 Granddaughter: Lady Heo of the Yangcheon Heo clan (허씨)
 Grandson-in-law: Yi Jin-ha (이진하)
 Son: Heo Ham (허함)
 Son: Heo Do (허도; 1536 – 1676)
 Grandson: Heo Yeom (허염)
 Grandson: Heo Byeon (허변)
 Grandson: Heo Yu (허유)
 Grandson: Heo Yi (허이)
 Daughter: Lady Heo of the Yangcheon Heo clan (허씨)
 Son-in-law: Yun Seung-ri (윤승리)
 Daughter: Lady Heo of the Yangcheon Heo clan (허씨)
 Son-in-law: Jeong Gi-yun (정기윤)

See also 
 List of Korean philosophers
 Korean philosophy
 Song Si-yeol
 Yun Hyu
 Yun Seon-do
 Bojihwayangdong buralsongseonsaeng

References

External links 
 Heo Mok
 Heo Mok:Daum 
 Heo Mok:Nate 
 Heo Mok:Naver 
 Heo Mok 
 Heo Mok 
 Heo Mok 
 허목－ 은거당의 옛터를 찾아서 (下)
 허목－ 은거당의 옛터를 찾아서 (上)

1596 births
1682 deaths
17th-century Korean calligraphers
17th-century Korean painters
17th-century Korean philosophers
17th-century Korean poets
17th-century politicians
Heo clan of Yangcheon
Joseon politicians
Korean Confucianists
Korean male poets
Korean scholars